Friedrichshafen FF.49 was a German, two-seat, single-engine float-plane designed by Flugzeugbau Friedrichshafen in 1917.

Variants
FF.39Two-seat reconnaissance float-plane, powered by a  Benz Bz.IV water-cooled 6-cylinder piston engine. 14 built.
FF.49bTwo-seat bomber float-plane. 25 built.
FF.49cTwo-seat reconnaissance float-plane.
Orlogsværftet HB.IISeven FF.49s re-conditioned at the Orlogsværftet / Flyvetroppernes Værksteder in Denmark.

Operators
 Royal Danish NavyDanish Air Lines (postwar), (one FF.49C)
 Finnish Air Force (four FF.49C, one FF.49B; in use 1918–1923)
 Kaiserliche Marine
 Royal Netherlands Navy
 (four FF.49C, by A/S Aero)
 Polish Air Force (postwar)
 Swedish Navy (postwar), (two FF.49C, in use 1919–1924)

Specifications (FF.49c)

See also

References

Bibliography

1910s German military reconnaissance aircraft
Floatplanes
Biplanes
Single-engined tractor aircraft
FF.49
Aircraft first flown in 1917